Reynold Tharp (born June 17, 1973) is an American composer of contemporary classical music. His music reflects a fascination with transitory physical aspects of sound, such as resonance and decay.

Tharp was born in Indiana, and studied music composition and history at Oberlin College before entering the graduate program in composition at the University of California, Berkeley. As a recipient of the university's Ladd Fellowship, he spent two years in Paris studying composition with Philippe Leroux and orchestration with Marc-André Dalbavie. He was selected for the Stage d’Automne at IRCAM in 2000 and has participated in workshops and seminars with Ivan Fedele, Brian Ferneyhough and Jonathan Harvey.

In recent years, his music has been performed in the U.S. and Europe by groups such as the Berkeley Contemporary Chamber Players, the Orchestre Lyrique de Region Avignon-Provence and the Nieuw Ensemble (Amsterdam), which commissioned and premiered his work A Backward Glance in 2000. Several of these performances have been broadcast on French and Dutch radio.

Awards for his music include BMI’s William Schuman Prize, Columbia University’s Joseph H. Bearns Prize for his orchestral work Drift and UC Berkeley’s Nicola DeLorenzo Prize. Recent projects include commissions from the Irving M. Klein International String Competition, the San Francisco Contemporary Music Players for their 2008-2009 season and a duo for flute and harp for Jonathan Keeble and Ann Yeung.

Tharp has taught composition, orchestration, analysis and theory at the University of Illinois at Urbana-Champaign, UC Berkeley, Northwestern University and San Francisco State University.

Compositions
"Wide sea, changeful heaven" for orchestra (2012)
"Red-winged Blackbird", for flute, violin, and viola (2012)
"Chaparral (Cantilena alla memoria di John Thow)" for flute and harp (2011)
"Anima Liberata", for soprano, cello, and piano (2010)
San Francisco Night, for eight players (2008)
Vertiginous Lines, for solo violin (2006)
Fog Lines, for solo viola (2006)
Wavering Lines, for solo cello (2006)
Littoral, for solo piano (2006) 
Mountains and Seas, for piano and percussion (2005) 
Cold Horizon, for chamber orchestra (2003-5) 
In Passing, for chamber orchestra (2001)
Cold, for vibraphone and piano (2000, rev. 2002)
Dis-moi vite, for chamber ensemble (2000)
A Backward Glance, for 12 players (1999)
Far and Away, for string quartet (1998)
Etching, for cor anglais, clarinet, viola, and piano (1997) 
Drift, for orchestra (1996)
Three Fables, for flute and string quartet (1996)

References
Faculty page at the University of Illinois at Urbana-Champaign
National Endowment for the Arts Grant Awards list for 2008
 Acanthes Seminar Archive
Brochure from Nieuw Ensemble's premiere of A Backward Glance
Concert preview by the Daily Cal

External links
Listen to music by Reynold Tharp
Review of "San Francisco Night" by the New York Times
Review of "San Francisco Night" by the Financial Times
Review of "San Francisco Night" by the San Francisco Classical Voice
Video of Vertiginous Lines
Review of Mountains and Seas by the San Francisco Classical Voice
Review of Etching by the San Francisco Classical Voice

1973 births
American male composers
21st-century American composers
Living people
People from Indiana
21st-century American male musicians